Geday (also Romanized as Gedāy; also known as Aḩmadābād) is a village in Yowla Galdi Rural District, in the Central District of Showt County, West Azerbaijan Province, Iran. At the 2006 census, its population was 365, in 101 families.

References 

Populated places in Showt County